{{Speciesbox
| name = St Bernard's lily
| genus = Anthericum 
| species = liliago
| image = Pajecznica liliowata Anthericum lilago3.jpg
| authority = L.
| synonyms =
Anthericum amoenum Salisb.
Anthericum intermedium Willk.
Anthericum liliago f. macrocarpum (Boros) Soó
Anthericum liliago f. maius Bolzon
Anthericum liliago subsp. australe (Willk.) Malag., 1973
Anthericum liliago subsp. macrocarpum Boros
Anthericum liliago var. australe Willk.
Anthericum liliago var. liliago
Anthericum liliago var. multiflorum P.Küpfer
Anthericum liliago var. racemosum Döll
Anthericum liliago var. ramosum Döll
Anthericum liliago var. sphaerocarpum P.Küpfer
Anthericum liliago var. transmontanum Samp.
Anthericum macrocarpum Boros
Anthericum non-ramosum Gilib.
Anthericum non-ramosum' infrasubsp. oppr
Liliago boetica C.Presl, 1845
Liliago vulgaris C.Presl
Ornithogalum gramineum Lam.
Phalangites liliago (L.) Bubani
Phalangium acuminatum Dulac
Phalangium lilaceum St.-Lag.
Phalangium liliaginoides Schltdl.
Phalangium liliago (L.) Schreb.
Phalangium renarnii Booth
Phalangium renarnii Booth ex Schltdl.
| synonyms_ref = 
}}Anthericum liliago, the St Bernard's lily''', is a species of flowering plant in the family Asparagaceae. It is native to mainland Europe (not the British Isles) and Turkey, growing in dry pastures, stony places and open woods and flowering in early summer. In Sweden the northernmost stable populations grows along the rocky shores of Lake Sommen (58° N), albeit on occasions it has been found as far north as Uppland (60° N).

Etymology
The specific epithet liliago means lily-like or lily-carrier. Like many plants whose common names include "lily", it is not closely related to the true lilies.

Description

Cultivation
Best grown in well-drained soil in a sunny position, A. liliago'' can be propagated by seed or by division of the rootstock every 3 to 4 years. It is a slow starter but forms large clumps with time (USDA Zone 6). The cultivar ‘Major’ has gained the Royal Horticultural Society’s Award of Garden Merit.

See also

 List of plants known as lily

References

Agavoideae
Plants described in 1753
Taxa named by Carl Linnaeus